Güira de Melena is a municipality and town in the Artemisa Province since January 1. of 2011, before it was part of the Havana province. Cuba. It is located on the southern shore of the island, bordering the Bay of Batabanó and on the west part of Cuba . It was founded in 1779.

Geography
The town is south of San Antonio de los Baños, west of Quivican and east of Alquízar.

The municipality is divided into the barrios of Gabriel, Cajio, Tumbadero, La Cachimba, Penalver, Pulguero, Guerrilla, Pekin and Corea.

The municipality is divided into 6 consejos populares (i.e. "popular councils"): Vivian Alonso, Niceto Pérez, Ubaldo Díaz, Cajio, Gabriel, and Junco

Economy
The principal economic activities include agriculture, especially tobacco; the city has cigar factories. Other agricultural products are potatoes, bananas, pineapples and other tropical fruits, and dairy products.

Demographics
In 2004, the municipality of Güira de Melena had a population of 37,838.

See also
Municipalities of Cuba
List of cities in Cuba
Güira de Melena Municipal Museum

References

External links

 Article from El Habanero newspaper 

Populated places in Artemisa Province